Lebia atriventris is a species of beetle in the family Carabidae. It is found in the United States and Canada.

References

Further reading

 
 

Lebia
Beetles described in 1823
Taxa named by Thomas Say